Faroe Islands women's national under-17 football team represents Faroe Islands in international youth football competitions.

FIFA U-17 Women's World Cup

The team has never qualified for the  FIFA U-17 Women's World Cup

UEFA Women's Under-17 Championship

The team qualified for the first time in 2021 when the Faroe Islands were awarded the hosting rights to the 2025 championship on 19 April. However, the team may qualify earlier than 2025.

See also
Faroe Islands women's national football team

References

External links

U17
Youth football in the Faroe Islands
Women's national under-17 association football teams